Prostatic artery embolization (PAE, or prostate artery embolisation) is a developing non-surgical technique for treatment of benign prostatic hypertrophy (BPH). Although there is increasing research on PAE, use of the technique remains at an incipient stage.

The procedure involves blocking the blood flow of small branches of the prostatic arteries using microparticles injected via a small catheter, to decrease the size of the prostate gland. It is a minimally invasive therapy which can be performed with local anesthesia,  as an outpatient procedure.

Treatment of lower urinary tract symptoms 
Men with an enlarged prostate may suffer from symptoms of lower urinary tract obstruction, such as sensation of incomplete urination, inability to urinate, weak urinary stream, or having to urinate frequently (often awakening from sleep). If the symptoms cause a significant disruption to quality of life, a man may undergo initial treatment by oral medication, such as alpha-1 receptor blockers, 5-alpha-reductase inhibitors, or phosphodiesterase-5 enzyme inhibitors. Those with severe/progressive symptoms or those who do not experience symptom relief from medication have traditionally been considered for surgical intervention, with transurethral resection of the prostate or TURP as the standard of care.

However, there are problems with both medical and surgical treatments, including undesired side effects and variable effectiveness. For example, sexual dysfunction and orthostatic hypotension are side effects of 5-alpha-reductase inhibitors. Prostatic artery embolization is an emerging treatment alternative which avoids the risks of systemic medication and of surgery.

The first report of selective prostatic artery embolization resulting in relief of prostate gland obstruction was published in 2000. Since then, prospective trials with small numbers of patients, up to approximately 200 patients/trial, have been carried out internationally.

Procedure 
After local anesthesia is placed, an interventional radiologist obtains access to the arterial system by piercing the femoral or radial artery, usually under ultrasound guidance, with a hollow needle known as a trocar. Through the needle a guidewire is threaded and subsequently the trocar is removed. The guidewire allows a 4 to 5 French sheath to be inserted into the artery.8 Contrast material is injected through the sheath or a catheter under fluoroscopic imaging or digital subtraction angiography which outlines the anatomy of the blood vessels. This technique is used to help locate the prostatic artery and advance a microcatheter (≤2.7 French) to the ostium of the prostatic artery. Microparticles, usually Microspheres, are then injected into the prostatic artery until full stasis distal prostatic artery and the proprietary prostatic vessels. They function by causing embolization (blockage of the artery) preventing blood flow to the prostate, functionally resulting in reduced prostate size.

Benefits 
A 2022 Cochrane review of studies involving men over 40 with enlarged prostates and lower urinary tract symptoms found that prostatic arterial embolization (PAE) may work similarly to common surgical options (transurethral resection of the prostate) to relieve symptoms and improve men's quality of life in the short term (up to a year). This review found that PAE may increase the need for retreatment. In the longer term (13–24 months), this review is very uncertain about the positive and negative effects of PAE in comparison with transurethral resection surgery.

Potential Adverse Events 
As PAE is a relatively new procedure, more data is needed to determine the incidence of adverse events. The majority of adverse events during PAE are likely due to non-target embolization, and are generally self-limited in nature. The Cochrane review from 2020 assessed the current evidence and found that there are great uncertainties whether PAE differs in terms of serious side effects or problems with erections  compared with transurethral resection of the prostate. However, PAE may reduce problems with ejaculation.

The most common adverse effects include acute urinary retention, rectal bleeding, pain, blood in the urine/sperm, and urinary tract infection. Serious complications are rare (0.3%), and include arterial dissection, bladder wall ischemia, and persistent urinary tract infection. Moreover, a post-embolization syndrome, consisting of pain, mild fever, malaise, nausea, vomiting and night sweats, is commonly observed after the procedure, and is treated with NSAIDS and other forms of analgesia.

One single-center prospective study reported an overall complication rate up to 20.6%, with mostly minor complications including hematospermia, diarrhea, and urethral trauma from foley insertion, with one major complication of UTI requiring intravenous antibiotics.

See also 
 Photoselective vaporization of the prostate
 Transurethral needle ablation
 Transurethral resection of the prostate

References

External links 
 Prostatic artery embolization. UK NHS

Prostatic procedures